Mohamed Al-Arjaoui (born 6 June 1987) is a Moroccan heavyweight amateur boxer who won the African Championships in 2015. He competed at the 2008,  2012 and 2016 Olympics but was eliminated in the first or second bout on all occasions.

References

External links 

 
 
 

1987 births
Living people
Heavyweight boxers
Olympic boxers of Morocco
Boxers at the 2008 Summer Olympics
Boxers at the 2012 Summer Olympics
Boxers at the 2016 Summer Olympics
People from Mohammedia
Moroccan male boxers
Mediterranean Games bronze medalists for Morocco
Mediterranean Games medalists in boxing
Competitors at the 2009 Mediterranean Games
Competitors at the 2013 Mediterranean Games
21st-century Moroccan people